Marsilly is a commune in the Charente-Maritime department in southwestern France.

Population

Personalities
Between 1932 and 1936, the well-known writer Georges Simenon and his wife Régine lived at La Richardière, a 16th-century manor house in Marsilly. The house is evoked in Simenon's novel Le Testament Donadieu

See also
 Communes of the Charente-Maritime department

References

External links
 

Communes of Charente-Maritime
Charente-Maritime communes articles needing translation from French Wikipedia
Populated coastal places in France